Hometown Throwdown is an annual music festival held in Greater Boston.  It is hosted by the Mighty Mighty Bosstones.  The festival features local Boston-area acts, focusing on ska, punk and hardcore bands.  The festival is traditionally held in December, usually the week between Christmas and New Year's Eve at clubs around Boston.  The first Throwdown was held in from July 27-31, 1994 at The Middle East in Cambridge. Starting in 1995, the festival moved to December, where it has remained ever since. It ran annually until 2002, when the Bosstones went on hiatus. Both the band, and their festival, returned to active status in 2007, and it has been held annually ever since, with the most recent Throwdown, the 22nd, being held December 27-29, 2019 at the House of Blues in Boston.

Festivals

Festivals have been held annually from 1994-2002 and again from 2007-present. The most recent was in 2019.

Recordings

Live from the Middle East, a Mighty Mighty Bosstones live album recorded over 5 days at the 1997 Throwdown

References

External links
Mighty Mighty Bosstones
Hometown Throwdown forum

Rock festivals in the United States